The North Division of the 2008 Twenty20 Cup determined which counties would qualify for the knockout stage of the 2008 Twenty20 Cup. Durham and Lancashire qualified automatically.

Table

* - The match on 27 June between Nottinghamshire and Yorkshire had no points awarded, due to Yorkshire fielding an ineligible player.

Matches

11 June

12 June

13 June

14 June

15 June

16 June

17 June

18 June

Durham Dynamos v Nottinghamshire Outlaws 
The match at the Riverside was abandoned without a ball being bowled. One point was awarded to both teams.

19 June

20 June

22 June

23 June

24 June

25 June

26 June

Yorkshire Carnegie v Leicestershire Foxes 
The match at Headingley was abandoned without a ball being bowled. One point was awarded to both teams.

27 June 

Due to Yorkshire fielding an ineligible player, the match was awarded to Nottinghamshire on 10 July. The result was changed back to a Yorkshire win, but with no points awarded on 14 July.

References

North Division, 2008 Twenty20 Cup